Cansu Dicle Tosun (born 26 January 1988) is a German-born Turkish actress.

Life and career 
Tosun was born in 1988 in Germany. Her parents are from Kayseri. Her father is a post office manager in Nuremberg and her mother works in a store. She has a twin brother named Fırat. She studied ballet at the German Opera for 13 years and worked as a professional photo model. She graduated from Commerce School at the same time in Germany. In Turkey, she started her career by working for TRT 1. She rose to prominence by playing the character of Neriman in the TV series Küçük Hanımefendi between 2011 and 2012. In 2012, she was cast in Kanal D's series Kayıp Şehir as Zehra. In 2013, she portrayed the character of Ayşen in an adaptation of Refik Halit Karay's 1954 novel Bugünün Saraylısı. She then appeared in a supporting role in Star TV's series Göç Zamanı. She continued her career in television by playing roles in the series Familya, Bir Deli Sevda and Mehmetçik Kut'ül Amare.

Filmography

References

External links 
 
 

1988 births
Living people
Turkish television actresses
Turkish film actresses